Sebastián Riep (born 20 February 1976) is a former Argentine football player.

Club statistics

References

External links

1976 births
Living people
Argentine footballers
Cobreloa footballers
Cobresal footballers
Avispa Fukuoka players
Olympiacos F.C. players
Independiente Medellín footballers
Atlético Junior footballers
Barcelona S.C. footballers
J1 League players
Ecuadorian Serie A players
Categoría Primera A players
Argentine expatriate footballers
Expatriate footballers in Japan
Everton de Viña del Mar footballers
Expatriate footballers in Chile
Expatriate footballers in Colombia
Expatriate footballers in Venezuela
Expatriate footballers in Ecuador
Expatriate footballers in Greece
Association football midfielders